Harry Felix (1875–1961) was a right-handed pitcher in Major League Baseball during the  and  seasons. Felix made his debut for the New York Giants on October 5, 1901, pitching two innings at the end of a game against the Brooklyn Superbas. The following season, he pitched for the Philadelphia Phillies, starting on Opening Day and compiling a record of 1–3 in nine games, allowing 28 earned runs in 45 innings pitched. Felix also played in seven games at third base for the Phillies, compiling a batting average of .135 and a fielding percentage of .774 over his 16 games played. Felix played his last game on July 24, 1902 and died on October 17, 1961 in Miami, Florida.

References

External links

1870 births
1961 deaths
Baseball players from New York (state)
Major League Baseball pitchers
New York Giants (NL) players
Philadelphia Phillies players
Newark Colts players
Montreal Royals players
Louisville Colonels (minor league) players